Sitmarkho (also spelled Sitt Markhu) is a town in northwestern Syria, administratively part of the Latakia Governorate, located north of Latakia. Nearby localities include Kirsana and Mushayrafet al-Samouk to the north, Burj al-Qasab and Al-Qanjarah to the west. According to the Syria Central Bureau of Statistics, Sitmarkho had a population of 2,341 in the 2004 census. Its inhabitants are predominantly Alawites.

References

Populated places in Latakia District
Alawite communities in Syria